Apage is an Ancient Greek word (ἄπαγε, Imperative of ἀπάγω, "lead away") and means:

In Ancient Greek an annoyed exclamation: Pack off!, Away with you! or as the phrase Ἄπαγε ἐς μακαρίαν ἐκποδῶν: Damn you!. Used in Catholic exorcism, most usually in the phrase "Apage, Satana!" - "Away with you, Satan!".
In the Middle Ages it was a battle cry, which was used to start a feud or a combat reenactment.
In Dutch, one could translate this as 'Ga weg!', expressing a feeling of unbelief.
Apage is used multiple times in Lucian's texts, to express disbelief, like when Hermes tells Poseidon that Zeus is pregnant in his thigh, or when Menippos does not want to pay Charon his fee.

Battle cries
Exorcism in the Catholic Church
Greek words and phrases
Magic words